Stand Tall may refer to:
 "Stand Tall" (Burton Cummings song), 1976 
 "Stand Tall" (Bahjat song), 2015
 "Stand Tall" (Childish Gambino song), 2016
 Stand Tall (film), a 1997 bodybuilding documentary
 Stand Tall, a 2002 novel by Joan Bauer

See also
 Standing Tall (disambiguation)
 Walking Tall (1973 film)